Appoline Agatha Alexander Blair (September 14, 1828 – Sep. 5, 1908) was an American philanthropist, hospital founder, and wife of Senator (and Civil War general) Francis Preston Blair Jr.

Biography
Appoline Agatha Alexander was born to Andrew Alexander of Woodford County, Kentucky. She married Francis Preston Blair Jr. (1821–1875) on September 8, 1847, and had eight children. In 1878, after losing two children to illness, Blair gathered a group of 20 prominent women and organized the St. Louis Children's Hospital, for which she served as the first president of the Board of Managers. In addition to the St. Louis Children's Hospital, she is sometimes credited with the creation of the St. John's Medical Center in Joplin, Missouri, in 1896. She died on September 5, 1908 at the home of her daughter in St. Louis.

References

External links 

 Blair family papers at Princeton University Library. Special Collections

1828 births
1908 deaths
19th-century American philanthropists
Blair family